VA-205, nicknamed the Green Falcons, was an Attack Squadron of the U.S. Naval Reserve, based at Naval Air Station Atlanta, Georgia. It was established on 1 July 1970 and disestablished on 31 December 1994.

Operational history
1 July 1970: VA-205, a reserve squadron, was established as part of a reorganization intended to increase the combat readiness of the Naval Air Reserve Force.
This was the first complete reserve carrier air wing deployment aboard a carrier.
May 1972: The squadron participated in exercise Exotic Dancer V, designed to test multi-service operations under a unified command organization.
4 September 1975: Squadron pilots began transition training with VA-125 in preparation for receiving the A-7 Corsair II.
10–23 May 1986: During an annual active duty deployment to NAS Fallon, the squadron participated in close air support training, air wing strike evolutions, and an excellent simulated two-day war exercise conducted by Strike University.
1 Oct 1993: The squadron assumed the additional mission (Fleet Support Readiness Group, FTRG) of providing electronic support to simulate missile attacks on surface ships for training purposes. This mission had previously been performed by VAQ-33 (Carrier Tactical Electronics Warfare Squadron 33).

Aircraft assignment
The squadron first received the following aircraft on the dates shown:
 A-4L Skyhawk – 01 Oct 1970
 A-7B Corsair II – 26 Sep 1975
 A-7E Corsair II – 20 Jun 1984
 KA-6D Intruder – 22 Aug 1990
 A-6E Intruder – 17 Nov 1990

See also
 List of squadrons in the Dictionary of American Naval Aviation Squadrons
 Attack aircraft
 List of inactive United States Navy aircraft squadrons
 History of the United States Navy

References

Attack squadrons of the United States Navy
Wikipedia articles incorporating text from the Dictionary of American Naval Aviation Squadrons